Cai Huikang (born 10 October 1989) is a Chinese footballer who currently plays for Shanghai SIPG in the Chinese Super League.

Club career
Cai Huikang started his football career when he joined the Genbao Football Academy in 2000 and was promoted to Shanghai SIPG's first team during the 2006 season. He became a regular as Shanghai won promotion to the second tier in the 2007 season. He scored his first goal for the club on 18 April 2008 in a 1-1 draw against Beijing Hongdeng. He lost his starting role during the 2011 season and was linked with a move to Guangdong Sunray Cave at the end of the season. Cai decided to stay at the club and appeared in 29 league matches in the 2012 season as Shanghai won the second tier league title and was subsequently promoted to the top flight.

International career
Cai made his debut for the Chinese national team on 18 June 2014 in a 2-0 win against Macedonia.

Career statistics

Club statistics
.

International statistics

Honours

Club
Shanghai SIPG
Chinese Super League: 2018
China League One: 2012
China League Two: 2007
Chinese FA Super Cup: 2019

References

External links
 
 

1989 births
Living people
Chinese footballers
Footballers from Shanghai

Shanghai Port F.C. players
Association football midfielders
China international footballers
2015 AFC Asian Cup players
Chinese Super League players
China League One players
China League Two players